William Debenham was a Member of Parliament and a merchant. His years of birth and death are unrecorded.

He was one of the two MPs for Ipswich in September 1397. His son, William Debenham the younger, was also an MP for Ipswich

References

Debenham
People from Ipswich
14th-century births
Year of death unknown
14th-century merchants